Liz McGregor is a South African author and a journalist who worked for leading South African newspapers such as the Sunday Times and the Rand Daily Mail. Some of the books written by McGregor include and Load-shedding: Writing On and Over the Edge of South Africa and Khabzela: The Life and Times of a South African.

Biography 
McGregor was born in Cape Town. McGregor left South Africa in 1985, returning in 2002 to work on a story commissioned by New York Magazine.

Work 
McGregor profiled the life of South Africa's popular radio DJ, Fana Khaba, in Khabzela: The Life and Times of a South African (2005). The book was called a powerful and compassionate study by the Journal of Southern African Studies. In Who Killed the Rain Queen? (2007), McGregor investigates the death of a Limpopo rain queen at age 25.

McGregor's work, The Springbok Factory (2013), looks at the women in the lives of the Springbok Rugby players. The book also examines the divide between black and white rugby players in South Africa. McGregor spent two years researching her book. The Cape Times called The Springbok Factory "a riveting study of the inner workings of South African rugby." This book made her a "household name" in South African rugby circles.

References

External links
Official website

Living people
University of Cape Town alumni
South African journalists
Year of birth missing (living people)